Tvären is a circular bay close to Studsvik, Sweden. 

Within the bay is an ancient buried impact crater about 2 km in diameter. It was first identified using reflection seismology.  The crater is estimated to be about 455 million years old (Late Ordovician).

Asteroid 7771 Tvären is named after the bay.

References 

Impact craters of Sweden
Ordovician impact craters
Ordovician Sweden
Sandbian
Landforms of Södermanland County